Saïd Amara (28 March 1944 – 10 February 2020) was a Tunisian handball player and coach.

References

1944 births
2020 deaths
Handball coaches of international teams
Tunisian male handball players